The Gau Baden, renamed Gau Baden–Alsace (German: Gau Baden-Elsaß) in March 1941, was a de facto administrative division of Nazi Germany from 1933 to 1945 in the German state of Baden and, from 1940 onwards, in Alsace. Before that, from 1925 to 1933, it was the regional subdivision of the Nazi Party in that area.

History
The Nazi Gau (plural Gaue) system was originally established in a Nazi Party conference on 22 May 1926 in order to improve administration of the party structure. From 1933 onward, after the Nazi seizure of power, the Gaue increasingly replaced the German states as administrative subdivisions in Germany. In 1940, after Germany occupied the French region of Alsace, Gau Baden incorporated the two Alsatian départements of Bas-Rhin and Haut-Rhin, becoming Baden-Elsass. The seat of the Gau administration was originally Karlsruhe, but moved to Strasbourg after the German occupation of France.

At the head of each Gau stood a Gauleiter, a position which became increasingly more powerful, especially after the outbreak of the Second World War, with little interference from above. Local Gauleiters often held government positions as well as party ones and were in charge of, among other things, propaganda and surveillance and, from September 1944 onward, the Volkssturm and the defense of the Gau.

The position of Gauleiter in Baden was held by Robert Wagner from March 1925 for the duration of the Gau's existence. Wagner was executed on 14 August 1946 in Strasbourg for his crimes during the occupation of Alsace. His deputies were Karl Lenz (1926–31), Walter Köhler (1931–33) and Hermann Röhn (1934–45).

The Natzweiler-Struthof concentration camp was located in the Alsace region of the Gau.

See also
 Gauliga Baden, the highest association football league in the Baden region of the Gau from 1933 to 1945
 Gauliga Elsaß, the highest association football league in the Alsace region of the Gau from 1940 to 1945

References

External links
 Illustrated list of Gauleiter

Baden
1926 establishments in Germany
1945 disestablishments in Germany
History of Alsace
History of Baden